Georges Cuvier (1769–1832) was a French naturalist and zoologist.

Cuvier may also refer to:

Places
 Cuvier Island, an island in the Hauraki Gulf, New Zealand
 Cuvier, Jura, a commune of the Jura département in France
 Le Bas-Cuvier and Le Cuvier Rempart are rocky climbing areas in Fontainebleau, France.

Other uses
 Cuvier (name)
 Cuvier (crater), a lunar crater
 9614 Cuvier, a main-belt asteroid

See also
 Cuvier Press Club Building, a historic building in Cincinnati, Ohio
 Cuvier Press Club, housed in the Cuvier Press Club Building